Erigomicronus is a genus of sheet weavers erected by A. V. Tanasevitch in 2018 for two east Asian species. In the following week, B. K. Seo published the new genus Collis for three Korean species. Further investigation revealed that all five belonged to the same genus, and preferences was given to the one published mere days before the other.

Species
 it contains five species:
E. flavus (Seo, 2018) – Korea
E. lautus (Saito, 1984) – Japan
E. longembolus (Wunderlich & Li, 1995) (type) – Russia (Far East), China
E. pusillus (Seo, 2018) – Korea
E. silvaticus (Seo, 2018) – Korea

See also
 Maro
 Oreonetides
 List of Linyphiidae species (A–H)

References

Further reading

Linyphiidae genera
Spiders of Asia